Andranomavo is a town and commune in Madagascar. It belongs to the district of Soalala, which is a part of Boeny Region. The population of the commune was estimated to be approximately 27,000 in 2001 commune census.

Andranomavo is served by a local airport. Primary and junior level secondary education are available in town. The majority 90% of the population of the commune are farmers.  The most important crops are rice and raffia palm, while other important agricultural products are sugarcane and cassava.  Services provide employment for 10% of the population.

References and notes 

Populated places in Boeny